The Children of USSR (translit. Yaldei SSSR) is a 2005 Israeli drama film directed by Felix Gerchikov, and produced as part of the Israeli Project Greenlight reality show, which Gerchikov won. It was entered into the 29th Moscow International Film Festival. It won an Anat Pirchi Drama Award at the 22nd Jerusalem Film Festival in 2005, and the Best Israeli Film award at the 5th Annual Eilat International Film Festival in 2007.

Cast
 Daniel Bruck as Slava
 Salim Dau as Policeman
 Vladimir Freedman as Viktor the Coach
 Vitali Friedland as Kostyl'
  as Svetlana
 Arthur Marchenko as Banochka
 Shaul Mizrahi as Mashiah
 Niko Nikolaev as Vitaly
 Ygal Resnik as Mucha
 Sirak M. Sabahat as Nisim
 Anna Stephan as Oksana

References

External links
 
 The Children of USSR at the Israeli Film Database

2005 films
2005 drama films
Israeli drama films
2000s Hebrew-language films
2000s Russian-language films
2005 multilingual films
Israeli multilingual films